Saqr bin Rashid Al Qasimi was the Ruler of Ras Al Khaimah and Sharjah from 1777–1803 as head of the Al Qasimi maritime federation. He acceded following the resignation of his father, Sheikh Rashid bin Matar Al Qasimi, the head of the Al Qasimi after some 30 years' rule.

Saqr married the daughter of Sheikh Abdullah Al Ma'in of Qishm, a key ally of his father's and the former Sheikh of Qishm, cementing an alliance between the Ma'in and the Al Qasimi which consolidated Al Qasimi power in Qishm and Lingeh and gave them effective control of the access point to the Persian Gulf.

Saqr's  strong leadership helped the Al Qasimi expand their trading links, gaining a foothold in the coastal towns Charaj, Lingeh and Shinas on the Iranian side of the Persian Gulf, the islands of Siri, Qishm and Qais and Ras Al Khaimah (which was already in their hands) and Rams on the Arabian coast, an area known as Sir at the time.

Accusations of piracy 
At some time around the handover of power from Rashid to Saqr, the first accusation of piracy against the Al Qasimi was made by the British, after a vessel owned by the East India Company was taken off the coast of Ras Al Khaimah. Pressed by the British to explain their actions, the Al Qasimi response, from Rashid himself, was that the vessel was flying the colours of the Imam of Muscat, with whom the Al Qasimi were at war. An investigation led to a note written by Francis Warden, Chief Secretary to the Government of Bombay, which stated that not until 1796 could he trace an act of aggression by the Al Qasimi against the British flag. Nevertheless, the die was cast – the Al Qasimi would come into increasing conflict with the ally of their enemy in Muscat – the British.

In May 1797, the snow Bassein was boarded by Al Qasimi, but on recognising it as a British vessel, the boarders were instructed to leave the ship and it was allowed to proceed to Basra. In response to a protest from the British government, Saqr wrote: "God forbid I should think of capturing your vessels."

A further incident involving the Viper in Bushire then took place in September 1797, when the British boat became involved in a conflict between Al Qasimi and Omani boats, itself taking fire from the Al Qasimi. Again, Saqr protested friendship with the British and promised to bring his nephew, Sheikh Saleh, who had been in command of the Al Qasimi boats, to justice.

At the turn of the century, the Wahhabi forces of the First Saudi Kingdom started to encroach on the area and their threat against the Buraimi oasis caused the Sultan of Muscat to seek peace with Saqr.

On his death in 1803, Saqr was succeeded by his son, Sultan bin Saqr Al Qasimi.

References

18th-century monarchs in the Middle East
House of Al Qasimi
History of the United Arab Emirates
Sheikhs of the Emirate of Ras Al Khaimah
Sheikhs of the Emirate of Sharjah